Aung Thu is a Burmese name which may refer to:

Aung Thu (MP) (born 1966), Burmese politician
Aung Thu (activist) (born 1968), Burmese member of the 88 Generation Student Group
Aung Thu (footballer) (born 1996), Burmese striker
Aung Thu (minister) (born 1955), Burmese cabinet minister
Aung Thu (volleyball) (born 1993), Burmese volleyball player